William Nicholson Hodgson (14 August 1801 – 2 April 1876) was a British Conservative politician.

Political career
He was first elected MP for Carlisle in 1847 but this result was later declared void. However, he retained the seat in the resulting by-election in 1848. However, he lost the seat in 1852. In 1857, he regained the seat, but at the next election in 1859 was again defeated. Despite contesting the seat at a by-election in 1861, he did not regain the seat until 1865. He was then again defeated in 1868.

However, at the same election, he stood for election in East Cumberland where he was elected and held the seat until his death in 1876.

References

External links
 

UK MPs 1847–1852
UK MPs 1857–1859
UK MPs 1865–1868
UK MPs 1868–1874
UK MPs 1874–1880
1801 births
1876 deaths
Conservative Party (UK) MPs for English constituencies